Citizens of Boomtown is the seventh studio album by Irish band The Boomtown Rats, released on 13 March 2020 via BMG. It is the band's first album since 1984's In the Long Grass, and the first album to be recorded as four-piece band, as the keyboardist Johnnie Fingers didn't return when the band was reunited in 2013. It is also the last album to feature longtime guitarist Garry Roberts who died on November 8th, 2022.

Critical reception

Citizens of Boomtown was met with mixed or average reviews from critics. At Metacritic, which assigns a weighted average rating out of 100 to reviews from mainstream publications, this release received an average score of 58, based on 6 reviews. Thomas H. Green of The Arts Desk rated the album 3 out of 5 stars.

Track listing
All tracks composed by Bob Geldof; except where indicated
 "Trash Glam Baby" – 3:52
 "Sweet Thing" – 3:10
 "Monster Monkeys" (Geldof, Pete Briquette) – 4:25
 "She Said No" – 3:55
 "Passing Through" (Geldof, Pete Briquette) – 4:35
 "Here's a Postcard" – 3:52
 "K.I.S.S." (Geldof, Pete Briquette) – 3:10
 "Rock 'n' Roll Yé Yé" (Geldof, Darren Beale) – 4:54
 "Get a Grip" – 4:00
 "The Boomtown Rats" (Geldof, Pete Briquette) – 5:20

Personnel
The Boomtown Rats
Bob Geldof - vocals, guitar, harmonica
Garry Roberts - guitar
Pete Briquette - bass guitar, keyboards, drum programming
Simon Crowe - drums, vocals
with:
Darren Beale - lead guitar, Moog, backing vocals
Paul Cuddeford - guitar on "Passing Through"
Alan Dunn - keyboards, backing vocals
Luciano Cusack, Serafina Cusack - backing vocals
Technical
Pete Briquette, Rob Barrie - recording
Clemens Gritl - artwork
Sagan Cowne - sleeve, design

Charts

See also
List of 2020 albums

References

2020 albums
The Boomtown Rats albums
BMG Rights Management albums